Usnea is a genus of mostly pale grayish-green fruticose lichens that grow like leafless mini-shrubs or tassels anchored on bark or twigs. The genus is in the family Parmeliaceae. It grows all over the world. Members of the genus are commonly called old man's beard, beard lichen, or beard moss.

Like other lichens it is a symbiosis of two or three fungi and an alga. In Usnea, the fungus belongs to the division Ascomycota, while the alga is a member of the division Chlorophyta.

Members of the genus are similar to those of the genus Alectoria. A distinguishing test is that the branches of Usnea are somewhat elastic, but the branches of Alectoria snap cleanly off.

Systematics
The genus Usnea was circumscribed by Michel Adanson in 1763. He used the name designated by Johann Jacob Dillenius, whose earlier published description did not met the rules of valid publication as established by the International Code of Nomenclature for algae, fungi, and plants. However, he did not specify a type specimen; the species Usnea florida, moved to the genus by Friedrich Heinrich Wiggers in 1780, has been designated as the lectotype. Since the establishment of the genus, hundreds of Usnea species have been described. A three-volume series by Józef Motyka published in 1936 and 1947 listed 451 species. By 2006, the genus contained more than 600 species, which made it one of the largest genera within the family Parmeliaceae. However, many former species are now regarded as morphological varieties and adaptations to local circumstances. The number of recognized species in Finland has decreased for this reason, for example, dropping from 34 in 1951 to 25 in 1963 and only 12 in 2000. In addition, some former Usnea species have been moved to other genera; for instance, Usnea longissima was renamed Dolichousnea longissima in 2004. By 2022, the overall number of species assigned to the genus had dropped to 355.

The name Usnea is probably derived from the Arabic word Ushnah, meaning moss or lichen, though it may also mean "rope-like". Based on a fossil Usnea found in Baltic amber, the genus is known to date back to at least the late Eocene, about 34 million years ago.

Morphology and reproduction
As a fruticose lichen, Usnea appears as a shrub-like growth on host trees. Unlike other similar-looking fruticose lichens, species in this genus have an elastic chord or axis running through the middle of the thallus that can be revealed by gently pulling a filament apart from either end.  It reproduces via vegetative means through fragmentation, asexual means through soredia, or sexual means through ascogonium and spermatogonium. The growth rate of lichens in nature is slow, but the growth rate has been sped up in laboratory conditions where Usnea is being cultured.
Usnea looks very similar to the plant Spanish moss, so much so that the latter's Latin name is derived from it (Tillandsia usneoides, the 'Usnea-like Tillandsia').

Ecology

Like other lichens, Usnea often grows on sick or dying trees due to the pre-existing loss of canopy leaves, allowing for greater photosynthesis by the lichen's algae; this leads some gardeners to mistakenly blame the lichen for the tree's leaf loss and illness.

Usnea is very sensitive to air pollution, especially sulfur dioxide.  Under poor growing conditions, such as areas high in pollution, they may grow no larger than a few millimetres, if they survive at all. Where the air is unpolluted, they can grow to 10–20 cm long. It can sometimes be used as a bioindicator, because it tends to only grow in those regions where the air is clean, and of high quality.

Uses

Medical claims
According to Paul Bergner, Author of Medical Herbalism. "The usnic acid in Usnea is effective against gram positive bacteria such as Streptococcus and Staphylococcus, making Usnea a valuable addition to herbal formulas for sore throats and skin infections. It is also effective against a bacterium that commonly causes pneumonia"

There is reason to believe that Usnea, in high concentrations, could possess some toxicity.  The National Toxicology Program is currently evaluating the issue.

Dyes
Usnea species have been used to create orange, yellow, green, blue, and purple dyes for textiles.

Cosmetics
Usnea barbata has been used in cosmetic production for its antimicrobial and antifungal properties as a preservative and deodorant.

Combustible 
Usnea barbata when dry is extremely flammable and is often used as a firestarter.

Species

Usnea acromelana 
Usnea alboverrucata 
Usnea amblyoclada 
Usnea angulata 
Usnea antarctica 
Usnea aranea 
Usnea articulata 
Usnea aurantiaciparvula 
Usnea austrocampestris  – Falkland Islands
Usnea bismolliuscula 
Usnea boomiana 
Usnea brattiae 
Usnea cavernosa 
Usnea cedrosiana 
Usnea ceratina 
Usnea chaetophora 
Usnea cirrosa 
Usnea clerciana 
Usnea confusa 
Usnea cornuta 
Usnea crenulata 
Usnea crocata 
Usnea cylindrica 
Usnea diplotypus 
Usnea effusa 
Usnea elata 
Usnea elixii 
Usnea esperantiana 
Usnea exigua 
Usnea filipendula 
Usnea firmula 
Usnea flammea 
Usnea flavocardia 
Usnea flavorubescens 
Usnea fleigiae 
Usnea florida 
Usnea floriformis 
Usnea foveata 
Usnea fragilescens 
Usnea fulvoreagens 
Usnea galapagona 
Usnea geissleriana 
Usnea glabrata 
Usnea glabrescens 
Usnea glauca 
Usnea grandisora 
Usnea grandispora 
Usnea himantodes 
Usnea hirta 
Usnea inermis 
Usnea intermedia 
Usnea kalbiana 
Usnea krogiana 
Usnea lambii 
Usnea lapponica 
Usnea leana 
Usnea lutii 
Usnea macaronesica 
Usnea maculata 
Usnea marivelensis 
Usnea mayrhoferi 
Usnea mekista 
Usnea messutiae 
Usnea molliuscula 
Usnea myrmaiacaina 
Usnea neuropogonoides 
Usnea nidifica 
Usnea nidulifera 
Usnea oncodeoides 
Usnea oncodes 
Usnea oreophila 
Usnea pacificana 
Usnea pallidocarpa 
Usnea parafloridana 
Usnea patriciana 
Usnea pendulina 
Usnea perplexans 
Usnea poliothrix 
Usnea praetervisa 
Usnea propagulifera 
Usnea pulvinata 
Usnea pycnoclada 
Usnea pygmoidea 
Usnea quasirigida 
Usnea ramulosissima 
Usnea roseola 
Usnea rubicunda 
Usnea rubricornuta 
Usnea rubriglabrata 
Usnea rubrotincta 
Usnea sanguinea 
Usnea saxidilatata 
Usnea scabrata 
Usnea scabrida 
Usnea silesiaca 
Usnea subalpina 
Usnea subaranea 
Usnea subcapillaris 
Usnea subcomplecta 
Usnea subcornuta 
Usnea subdasaea 
Usnea subeciliata 
Usnea subflammea 
Usnea subflaveola 
Usnea subfloridana 
Usnea subglabrata 
Usnea subparvula 
Usnea subrubicunda 
Usnea subscabrosa 
Usnea tamborensis 
Usnea taylorii 
Usnea torulosa 
Usnea trachycarpa 
Usnea ushuaiensis 
Usnea viktoriana 
Usnea vrieseana 
Usnea wasmuthii 
Usnea xanthopoga

References

Sources
 
 
 
 
 
 
 
 
 
 
 

 
Parmeliaceae
Lichen genera
Lecanorales genera
Taxa described in 1763
Taxa named by Michel Adanson